Trophy Scars,  is an American experimental rock band from Morristown, New Jersey, United States, with blues and psychedelic influences. Trophy Scars began as a post-hardcore group but has since embraced broader genres.

Trophy Scars song catalog is embossed by major themes such as time, memory, language, and romantic tragedy. Known for their intimate live shows and independent booking techniques, Trophy Scars evokes a strong DIY ethic.

Biography
Trophy Scars was formed by Jerry Jones (vocals), John Ferrara (guitar), and Brian Ferrara (drums) in June 2002. Originally, the band was developed as a passion project only to last the duration of that particular summer. After several years, and passing through several musicians, the group, which eventually included long standing members Joshua Weinstein on bass and Mike Schipper on guitar, began playing local shows and gaining a modest but dedicated following. When fans presented a high demand for recorded material, Trophy Scars decided to establish themselves as a serious music group.

Trophy Scars signed to Brooklyn-based record label, the Death Scene Recording Company (US), in 2005 and with Small Town Records (UK) in 2007.  However, in 2009 they were no longer contractually obligated to either label and decided to release all forthcoming material independently. The band cited having complete control over their art and work schedule as a major reason for doing so.

Since 2002, Trophy Scars has incurred multiple member changes. The core group remain intact, however; Jerry Jones, John Ferrara, and Brian Ferrara are still concrete players, as well as Andy Farrell, who has been playing bass with the group since 2005. Studio personnel is also a rotating door of auxiliary musicians with producer, Chris Badami, as the sole stationary component to all of Trophy Scars' albums. Badami acts as the "fifth" Trophy Scars member; as Jones cites: "(He is) our George Martin."

Trophy Scars have released four full-length records, four EPs, a single, and a compilation of demos and unreleased material. Their first full-length, Darts to the Sea, was recorded in John Ferrara's basement using primitive sound engineering equipment. The record was released in 2003 and reissued in 2006 with a companion disc, Sand in the Sea, which included unreleased b-sides and demos from 2003-2004. Trophy Scars gained the attention of critics with their second release, Hospital Music for the Aesthetics of Language EP in 2004. The EP was the first output they recorded with Chris Badami and saw the band taking an unconventional, progressive approach to post-hardcore. The EP was reissued with new packaging and artwork in 2007.

Trophy Scars followed Hospital Music with a second EP, Goodnight Alchemy, in 2005. Goodnight Alchemy  was another turning point for the band; the EP was markedly much more dense and heavy than its predecessor. It was also the first Trophy Scars effort distributed by a label (The Death Scene Recording Company). 2006 saw the release of their second full-length album, Alphabet. Alphabets. Trophy Scars demonstrated a conglomeration of different musical genres and styles while still retaining their unique take on post-hardcore. Following the release, the group became a full-time touring band when Jones graduated from Fordham University.

In mid-2007, Trophy Scars rented a beach house in Charleston, South Carolina to begin work on their follow-up full length to Alphabets. The band was heavily influenced by the warm climate, the city's nightlife, and psychedelia. Yet again, Trophy Scars readjusted their sound; this time to a blues-centric style. Jones titled the album Bad Luck as a reaction to the death of his best friend, Ben Brown. When the writing was completed for Bad Luck, the band invested their savings into a European tour, but was canceled last minute by the headlining act. Unable to get a refund on their European travel expenses and with their recording contract with the Death Scene dissolved, the band could not afford to tour or raise money for the album. The band was forced to go on an indefinite hiatus with no foreseeable plans to release Bad Luck. Trophy Scars fans, however, banded together and started the "Bad Luck Foundation", which allowed internet users to donate money to the band. Within a month, Trophy Scars was financially stable and able to record their third full-length. In September 2009, Trophy Scar supported Fear Before and Baptized in Blood on a full Canadian tour titled "The Hunt for Shred October". In January 2010, Bad Luck was named the 10th best album of 2009 by popular music critic website, Sputnik Music.

Eight months after the release of Bad Luck, Trophy Scars put out a 7" vinyl split with the Saddest Landscape. The offering included a new, orchestral song, "August, 1980", inspired by Bram Stoker's Dracula and the Saddest Landscape's "So Lightly Thrown." Trophy Scars released the EP, Darkness, Oh Hell, in October 2010. The album is a further throwback to the blues and psychedelic rock music of the late 1960s while retaining a sinister edge. Darkness, Oh Hell was included in Sputnik Music's Top 50 Albums of 2010 as one of the best EPs of the year.

Trophy Scars released the follow-up to Darkness, Oh Hell, another EP, titled Never Born, Never Dead on July 19, 2011. The EP serves as the counter-piece to Darkness, Oh Hell and is much more uplifting musically and lyrically. The concept revolves around the several lives of two souls fixed in love through reincarnation. Although a departure in sound from the previous two releases, Never Born, Never Dead was met with strong praise and elected the #1 Best EP of the Year by Sputnik Music users.

The band announced they would be releasing their forthcoming full length, Holy Vacants, April 8, 2014 via Monotreme Records. The LP is a linear concept involving a romantic couple who have discovered The Fountain of Youth in the blood cells of angels. Jones states the album was heavily influenced by an intense personal relationship, his brief relocation to Los Angeles, and film director David Lynch.

A DVD containing videos that span their career, as well as documentary footage and a live concert recorded in November, 2010, is presumably in the works for an undetermined release date.

Astral Pariah, the band's first album in 7 years, was released September 10, 2021. The 9-track concept album, which was entirely self-produced and mixed, tells the story of a family during the post-Civil War era of western expansion.

Members

Current
Jerry Jones - vocals
John Ferrara - guitar, vocals
Brian Ferrara - drums, vocals, extra percussion
Andy Farrell - bass, vocals
Gray Reinhard - piano
Adam Moutafis (former member) - guitar and piano

Discography 
Darts to the Sea (Over and Out Records, 2003)
Hospital Music for the Aesthetics of Language (Independent, 2004)
Goodnight Alchemy (The Death Scene Recording Company, 2005)
Darts to the Sea / Sand in the Sea (AoA Records, 2006)
Alphabet. Alphabets. (The Death Scene Recording Company, 2006)
Hospital Music for the Aesthetics of Language (Reap What You Sew, 2007)
Bad Luck (Independent, 2009)
7" Split w/ The Saddest Landscape (Bear Records, 2009)
Darkness, Oh Hell (Independent, 2010)
Never Born, Never Dead (Independent, 2011)
Holy Vacants (Monotreme Records, 2014)
Astral Pariah (Gruesome Twosome Records, 2021)

References

External links
PureVolume

American post-hardcore musical groups
Punk rock groups from New Jersey
Indie rock musical groups from New Jersey